Ashtargarden (also Romanized as Āshtargarden) is a village in Siyahrud Rural District, in the Central District of Tehran County, Tehran Province, Iran. At the 2006 census, its population was 61, in 29 families.

References 

Populated places in Tehran County